Jennifer Jean Johnson (born August 2, 1991) is an American professional golfer.

Johnson was born in San Diego, California. She played one year of college golf at Arizona State University. She was an All-American as a freshman, then turned professional. She played on several winning U.S. amateur teams: Junior Ryder Cup in 2008, Junior Solheim Cup in 2009, and Curtis Cup in 2010. She lost to Jennifer Song in the 2009 U.S. Women's Amateur final.

Johnson turned professional in 2010. She won her first professional tournament at the 2013 Mobile Bay LPGA Classic.

In 2017, she became an assistant coach of the Cal State San Marcos men's golf team.

Amateur wins
2008 California Women's Amateur, Rolex Tournament of Champions

Professional wins

LPGA Tour wins

Team appearances
Amateur
Junior Ryder Cup: 2008 (winners)
Junior Solheim Cup: 2009 (winners)
Curtis Cup: 2010 (winners)

References

External links

American female golfers
Arizona State Sun Devils women's golfers
LPGA Tour golfers
Golfers from San Diego
1991 births
Living people